Petrovskoye is a rural locality (a selo) and the administrative center of Petrovsky District, Tambov Oblast, Russia. Population:

References

Notes

Sources

Rural localities in Tambov Oblast